Versata is a business-rules based application development environment running in Java EE. It is a subsidiary of Trilogy, Inc.

History
Versata started in the early 1990s as a software consulting company called Vision Software. Over time it developed and sold software for Microsoft Visual Basic development market. Around 1994, it began development of an integrated development environment for applications. It included a GUI builder and a business rules engine that enabled developers to create a Web application rapidly using MS SQL Server or Oracle in the backend. The product, called Vision Jade, was released around 1997. It was enhanced to support three tier applications and Java thin clients.

Vision Software changed its key product and company name to Versata, went public in March 2000 and, on that day, was worth an astonishing $4 billion—astonishing considering that the company had revenues of about $60 million and was losing a lot of money; but this was during the Dot-com bubble. Despite hard times, Versata has managed to stay alive and maintain its customer base.

In November 2000, Versata expanded into the business workflow area with the acquisition of Verve, Inc..

From early 2001 through mid-2003 Versata's revenues were in quarter over quarter decline until Alan Baratz took over as CEO. Five consecutive quarters of growth followed until early 2005 when revenues once again took a downward plunge.

Mid-2005 the company was notified by NASDAQ that it no longer met NASDAQ's requirements for continued listing, related to maintenance of a minimum amount of shareholder's equity, market value, or net income. Rather than continue to focus on these requirements, the company decided to move to the OTC (also known as the Pink Sheets) in order to remain publicly traded.

On 7 December 2005, Versata announced that Austin based Trilogy, Inc. had made an offer to acquire the company by tender. That deal was consummated in February 2006, taking the company private.

Trilogy then proceeded to merge portions of Trilogy, specifically, Trilogy Technology Group, into Versata and began acquiring further companies, reorganizing dramatically and offshoring most technical positions to its office in Bangalore, India.

From 2006 to 2008, Versata continued to make acquisitions mostly in US. Most of the employees in the acquired companies were laid -off with the majority work being offshored to its India office in Bangalore.

In early 2009, Versata made another major overhaul of its business model when it asked all its employees in India to work as contractors through oDesk for a gDev which is an entity incorporated by Trilogy to manage its outsourcing activities. The only employees left in Versata were the ones in US.

A jury in the Eastern District of Texas awarded Versata Software $139m following its decision that SAP infringed two of Versata's patents - U.S. Patent No. 6,553,350 and U.S. Patent No. 5,878,400. Sam Baxter, Ted Stevenson, Scott Cole and Steve Pollinger of McKool Smith represented Versata on this case. iRunway India Private Limited and NTrak LLC were the technical consultants and provided end-to-end litigation support to McKool Smith.
The case has been rumbling on for a couple of years now, hinging on Versata-owned patents that cover mechanisms for pricing products.  In January 2011, the judge in the case set aside the damages award, and ordered a new trial on damages.

In June, 2010 Versata filed an antitrust complaint against SAP AG. It alleges that SAP illegally excluded Versata from selling to vast majority of large ERP customers.

Acquisitions
On July 3, 2006, Versata acquired Artemis International Solutions Corporation, a provider of project and product portfolio management tools, including Artemis (software).

In September 2007, Versata acquired Nextance a provider of enterprise contract management solutions.

In November 2007, Versata acquired Gensym. Gensym is a provider of business rule engine software.

February 22, 2008 – Privately held Versata Enterprises, Inc. Announced the acquisition of NUVO Network Management Inc. Nuvo was a Canadian-based managed service provider/software provider.

February 25, 2008 - Versata acquired AlterPoint, a maker of Network Change and Configuration Management (NCCM) software.

March, 2008 - Versata acquired Tenfold Corporation. TenFold Corporation (OTC: TENF.OB)is a provider of EnterpriseTenFold SOA, an SOA-compliant, Ajax-enabled solutions framework for adding functionality to existing applications and building enterprise-scale applications.

In May 2008, Versata acquired Evolutionary Technologies International (ETI) and Clear Technologies.

On August 7, 2009 - Versata announced the acquisition of Everest Software, Inc. (Everest), a provider of retail and wholesale business management software.

On January 14, 2010 - Versata announced the acquisition of PurchasingNet, Inc. PurchasingNet, a Web-based provider of eProcurement, ePayables and Financial Management services and solutions to mid- and large-sized organizations.

References

External links
 Gensym Home Page
 Nextance Home Page
 Versata Think3 Corporate Fraud?
 AlterPoint Home Page

Software companies of the United States
Rule engines